Club Deportivo Atlético Baleares, officially named Balears Futbol Club, is the women's football section of the CD Atlético Baleares. The club is located in Palma (Mallorca, Balearic Islands). Play in Segunda Federación, third level of Spanish women's soccer. Play their matches at Camp de Son Malferit.

History 

The current team had a precedent in the 1980s, when the CIDE team of Palma became part of the white-and-blue club in the 1984–85 season. The team ended the season as champion of the Regional League of Mallorca and played quarterfinals of Copa de la Reina, but did not have continuity and moved again to another club when the season ended.

The current section was presented on August 6, 2018, consist of an amateur category team of 18 players and that same season 2018–19 was promoted to Primera Nacional. In 2021–22 season the team ended second and was promoted to Segunda Federación, a newly created third category.

Stadium

Atlético Baleares holds its home games at Camp de Son Malferit, with a 1,200-spectators capacity.

Season to season

Titles
 Regional (T3)
 Winners 1984–85, 2017–18: 2

 Primera Nacional
 Runners-up 2021–22: 1

Current squad

References

External links
Official website 

 
Women's football clubs in Spain
Association football clubs established in 1920
1984 establishments in Spain
2018 establishments in Spain
Sport in Palma de Mallorca
Football clubs in the Balearic Islands